Hong'an County, formerly named Huang'an County (Hwangan), located to the north of Wuhan, is a county in Huanggang, Hubei province, People's Republic of China.

Hong'an is known as the "County of Generals" in that more than 200 (or 79 with the real rank, plus those who had a similar rank during or after Liberation War, making 223) Chinese army generals have been born there, a total far greater than for any other county in all of China.

The former military leader and national President of China, Li Xiannian (1909–1992), was born in Hong'an.

History
In 845 BC Marquis Wen Huang Meng (aka Huang Zhang) moved the capital of the State of Huang from Yicheng to Huangchuan (present-day Huangchuan, Henan). Huang Xi's descendants ruled State of Huang until 648 BC when it was destroyed by the State of Chu. The Marquis of Huang, Marquis Mu Huang Qisheng, fled to the state of Qi. The people of Huang were forced to relocate to Chu. They settled in the region of present-day Hubei province, in a region known as the Jiangxia Prefecture during the Han dynasty (206 BC-AD 220). There are many places in this region today that were named after Huang e.g. Huanggang, Huangpi, Huangmei, Huangshi, Huang'an (now Hong'an), Huangzhou etc. A large number of the people of Huang were also relocated to regions south of the Yangtze River.

Geography

Administrative divisions
Hong'an County administers 13 township-level divisions:

Climate

References

Huanggang
Counties of Hubei